Rugby football positions  may refer to:
Rugby league positions
Rugby union positions